Chrysiptera rex, commonly known as the king demoiselle, is a species of damselfish in the family Pomacentridae. It is native to the eastern Indian Ocean and western Pacific, where it lives around reefs. It grows up to 7 centimetres long. It is of commercial importance in the aquarium trade.

References

External links
 

rex
Fish described in 1909